Dzmitry Siarhieyevich Asanau (born 18 May 1996) is a Belarusian professional boxer. In 2015, he won a silver medal at the European Games and a bronze at the world championships. He competed in the bantamweight event at the 2016 Summer Olympics, but was eliminated in the second bout.

Professional boxing record

References

External links

 

1996 births
Living people
Belarusian male boxers
Olympic boxers of Belarus
Boxers at the 2016 Summer Olympics
People from Maladzyechna
Boxers at the 2015 European Games
European Games medalists in boxing
European Games silver medalists for Belarus
Boxers at the 2019 European Games
European Games gold medalists for Belarus
AIBA World Boxing Championships medalists
Bantamweight boxers
Boxers at the 2020 Summer Olympics
Sportspeople from Minsk Region
21st-century Belarusian people